Jamie Lloyd (born 1980 in Poole, Dorset) is a British director, best known for his work with his eponymous theatre company (The Jamie Lloyd Company). He is known for his modern minimalism and expressionist directorial style. He is a proponent of affordable theatre for young and diverse audiences, and has been praised as "redefining West End theatre". The Daily Telegraph critic Dominic Cavendish wrote of Lloyd, "Few directors have Lloyd’s ability to transport us to the upper echelons of theatrical pleasure."

Memorable productions include the Broadway revival of Betrayal (2019) with Tom Hiddleston, the West End production of The Seagull (2020-2021) with Emilia Clarke, the Brooklyn Academy of Music's production of Cyrano de Bergerac (2022) with James McAvoy, and the Broadway revival of A Doll's House (2023) with Jessica Chastain.

Early career
Lloyd's first main house production was Harold Pinter's The Caretaker at the Sheffield Crucible, which started a fruitful relationship with the playwright. Lloyd has been heralded as a major Pinter interpreter.

He directed a Pinter double-bill in the West End - The Lover and The Collection - in 2008 before Michael Grandage appointed him as an associate director of the Donmar Warehouse.

Lloyd was the associate director of the Donmar Warehouse from 2008 to 2011, where his 2008 production of Piaf transferred to the West End and to Buenos Aires and his 2010 production of Passion won the Evening Standard Award for Best Musical. He was also an Associate Artist at theatre company Headlong, for whom he directed an anarchic production of Oscar Wilde's Salome.

In 2008 he directed The Pride at the Royal Court, for which he won the Olivier Award for Outstanding Achievement in an Affiliate Theatre. Seen as a 'wunderkind of London theatre', he was named a Rising Star by the Daily Telegraph in 2009.

The Jamie Lloyd Company
In 2013, the Jamie Lloyd Company was launched with the Ambassador Theatre Group. With this company, he presented a season of work in 2013 as artistic director at Trafalgar Studios.

The first season featured three productions: a revival of The Pride (which also went on a short UK tour), The Hothouse starring Simon Russell Beale and John Simm, and Macbeth, starring James McAvoy and Claire Foy, which received an Olivier nomination for Best Revival. A second Trafalgar Transformed season opened in July 2014 with Richard III starring Martin Freeman, East is East, and The Ruling Class, again starring James McAvoy.

Lloyd has worked frequently with McAvoy since 2009, a relationship that began with a production of Richard Greenberg's Three Days of Rain at the Apollo Theatre. More recently, McAvoy starred in a radio version of Heart of Darkness, which Lloyd directed and adapted for BBC Radio 4. He completed a run of the Olivier Award-winning Cyrano de Bergerac with Lloyd in February 2020.

In 2014, Lloyd was named the 20th Most Powerful Person in British Theatre by The Stage in its annual Stage 100 list. He was the youngest director to break into the list since Sam Mendes.

Following this, in 2020, Lloyd was named the 9th most influential person in British Theatre in the prestigious Stage 100 list. He was the highest placed director on the list.

In 2015, Lloyd directed Harold Pinter's The Homecoming starring Gemma Chan and John Simm. The following year he directed a new adaptation of The Maids by Jean Genet, starring Uzo Aduba, Zawe Ashton, and Laura Carmichael, both at Trafalgar Studios. This was followed by Doctor Faustus in the Duke of York's Theatre starring Kit Harington. Every ticket for Monday performances of The Jamie Lloyd Company were priced at £15.

In 2018, Lloyd announced 'Pinter at the Pinter' a revolutionary sixth month long season of all of Harold Pinter's one act and short plays staged on the tenth anniversary of his death at The Harold Pinter Theatre. In the season, Lloyd directed: One for the Road; A New World Order; Mountain Language; the newly discovered The Pres and an Officer; The Lover; The Collection; Landscape; A Kind of Alaska; Monologue; Party Time; Celebration; The Dumb Waiter; and A Slight Ache, amongst many of Pinter's poems and speeches.

The Pinter at the Pinter season culminated with a revival of Betrayal starring Tom Hiddleston, Zawe Ashton, and Charlie Cox. The production received rave reviews with critic Matt Wolf remarking that the production "represents a benchmark achievement for everyone involved, and shows Pinter’s 1978 play in a revealing, even radical, new light." This production transferred to the Bernard B. Jacobs Theatre on Broadway for a limited run from August 2019. Lloyd was nominated for Best Director at the 2020 Tony Awards, along with Hiddleston who was nominated for Best Actor and the production received a nomination for Best Revival. Lloyd was also nominated for the Outer Critics Circle Award for Best Director; the production received an Outer Critics Circle nomination for Outstanding Revival of a Play, and the same nomination from the Drama League Awards. Ben Brantley in The New York Times called it 'one of those rare shows I seem destined to think about forever.' 

In 2019, Lloyd announced that he would be directing and producing a season of three plays at the Playhouse Theatre with The Jamie Lloyd Company. The season consisted of Cyrano de Bergerac with James McAvoy in a new version by Martin Crimp, The Seagull starring Emilia Clarke in a version by Anya Reiss, and A Doll's House starring Jessica Chastain. His production of Cyrano de Bergerac earned five Olivier Award nominations, including one for Best Director for Lloyd, Best Actor for McAvoy, and won Best Revival. He also won the Critic's Circle Award jointly for his productions of Betrayal, Evita and Cyrano, and was nominated for a South Bank Sky Arts Award for Cyrano de Bergerac. Cyrano also was due to transfer to New York in 2020, at the Brooklyn Academy of Music before American theatres closed due to COVID-19. As part of the Playhouse Season, the Jamie Lloyd Company committed to a wide-ranging outreach programme, giving 15,000 tickets away for free to each production to first time theatre goers, and with a further 15,000 £15 seats to young and low-income audience members.

Other work
Lloyd directed a production of Evita in Regent's Park Open Air Theatre in 2019, which received two Olivier Award nominations, including one for Best Musical Revival. This production also won Lloyd the Whatsonstage Award for Best Director and was due to transfer to the Barbican Theatre in 2019 before the closure of British theatres due to COVID-19. In 2012 Lloyd directed a critically acclaimed, 'turbo-charged' production of She Stoops to Conquer at the National Theatre, and The Duchess of Malfi at The Old Vic starring Eve Best. In 2013 he directed The Commitments in the Palace Theatre, West End (which then went on a UK Tour), followed by Urinetown at the St. James Theatre, which transferred to the Apollo Theatre in the West End. Lloyd directed the musical Assassins at the Menier Chocolate Factory in 2014 and was nominated for the Evening Standard award for Best Director.

Credits

Jamie Lloyd Company
 2021: A Doll's House (Playhouse Theatre)
 2020/2021: The Seagull (Playhouse Theatre)
 2019: Cyrano de Bergerac (Playhouse Theatre and BAM - Olivier win Best Revival, Olivier nomination Best Director, Critic's Circle Award Best Director, South Bank Sky Arts Award nomination)
 2019: Betrayal (Bernard B. Jacobs Theatre - Tony nomination Best Director, Tony nomination Best Revival)
 2019: Betrayal (Harold Pinter Theatre - Evening Standard nomination Best Director, Critic's Circle Award Best Director)
 2019: A Slight Ache and The Dumb Waiter Harold Pinter Theatre
 2018/2019: Party Time and Celebration The Harold Pinter Theatre
 2018: Landscape and A Kind of Alaska The Harold Pinter Theatre
 2018: The Lover and The Collection The Harold Pinter Theatre
 2018: One for the Road and The New World Order and Mountain Language and Ashes To Ashes The Harold Pinter Theatre
 2016: Doctor Faustus (Duke of York's Theatre)
 2016: The Maids (Trafalgar Studios)
 2016: The Homecoming (Trafalgar Studios)
 2015: The Ruling Class (Trafalgar Studios)
 2014: Richard III (Trafalgar Studios)
 2013: The Pride (Trafalgar Studios)
 2013: The Hothouse (Trafalgar Studios)
 2013: Macbeth (Trafalgar Studios - Olivier nomination Best Revival)

Other work
 2019/20: Evita (Regent's Park Open Air Theatre and Barbican - Olivier nomination Best Musical Revival, Evening Standard win Best Musical, Critic's Circle Award Best Director, WhatsOnStage Award Best Director)
 2017: Apologia (Trafalgar Studios)
 2017: Guards at the Taj by Rajiv Josef (Bush Theatre)
 2017: Killer by Philip Ridley (Shoreditch Town Hall)
 2017: The Pitchfork Disney by Philip Ridley at Shoreditch Town Hall
 2016: Doctor Faustus (Duke of York's Theatre)
 2014: Assassins (London - Evening Standard nomination for Best Director)
 2014: Urinetown (London)
 2013: The Commitments (West End)
 2012: Cyrano de Bergerac (Roundabout, Broadway)
 2012: The School for Scandal (Theatre Royal, Bath)
 2012: The Duchess of Malfi (Old Vic)
 2012: She Stoops To Conquer (National Theatre, Olivier)
 2011: Inadmissible Evidence
 2011: The 25th Annual Putnam County Spelling Bee
 2011: The Faith Machine (Royal Court)
 2010: Polar Bears by Mark Haddon
 2010: Passion (Olivier nomination Best Musical Revival, Evening Standard Award Best Musical)
 2010: Company (concert version)
 2010: Salome (Hampstead Theatre, for Headlong)
 2010: The Little Dog Laughed (Garrick)
 2009: Three Days of Rain (Apollo – Olivier nomination for Best Revival, Whatsonstage Awards nomination for Best Revival)
 2009: Staged Readings of A House Not Meant to Stand and The Cocktail Party
 2008: The Pride (Royal Court – Olivier award for Outstanding Achievement)
 2008: Piaf (also Vaudeville, Teatro Liceo, Buenos Aires and Nuevo Teatro Alcala, Madrid – Olivier nomination for Best Musical Revival and, in Argentina, ADEET Award for Best Production and Clarin Award for Best Musical Production)
 2008: Eric's (Liverpool Everyman)
 2008: The Lover and The Collection (Comedy)
 2007: The Caretaker (Sheffield Crucible and Tricycle)
 2004: Elegies: a Song Cycle (Arts)
 2001: Falsettoland (Edinburgh)

Awards and nominations

Theatre 

Awards
 2020 Laurence Olivier Award for Best Revival - Cyrano de Bergerac (Playhouse Theatre)
 2020 Whatsonstage Award for Best Director - Evita (Regent's Park Open Air Theatre)
 2019 Evening Standard Award for Best Musical Revival - Evita (Regent's Park Open Air Theatre)
 2010 Evening Standard Award for Best Musical - Passion (Donmar Warehouse)
 2008 Laurence Olivier Award for Outstanding Achievement in an Affiliate Theatre - The Pride (Royal Court)
Nominations
 2022 Drama League Award for Outstanding Direction of a Play - Cyrano de Bergerac (Brooklyn Academy of Music)
 2020 Tony Award for Best Revival - Betrayal
 2020 Tony Award for Best Direction of a Play - Betrayal
 2020 Laurence Olivier Award for Best Revival of a Musical - Evita (Regent's Park Open Air Theatre)
 2020 Laurence Olivier Award for Best Director - Cyrano de Bergerac (Playhouse Theatre)
 2020 South Bank Sky Arts Award - Cyrano de Bergerac
 2020 Drama League Award for Outstanding Revival of a Play - Betrayal
 2020 Outer Critics Circle Award for Best Director - Betrayal
 2020 Outer Critics Circle Award for Outstanding Revival of a Play - Betrayal
 2019 Evening Standard Award for Best Director - Betrayal (Harold Pinter Theatre)
 2013 Laurence Olivier Award for Best Revival - Macbeth (Trafalgar Studios, Trafalgar Studios)
 2010 Laurence Olivier Award for Best Musical Revival - Passion (Donmar Warehouse)
 2009 Laurence Olivier Award for Best Revival - Three Days of Rain (Apollo Theatre)
 2009 Whatsonstage Award for Best Revival - Three Days of Rain (Apollo Theatre)
 2008 Laurence Olivier Award for Best Musical Revival - Piaf (Donmar Warehouse)

References

English theatre directors
Living people
People educated at St Bede's School, Hailsham
1980 births
Date of birth missing (living people)
Place of birth missing (living people)
People from Poole